The discography of Trip Lee, an American Christian hip hop artist, consists of eight studio albums, including three as a founding member of the group 116 Clique, one EP with 116 Clique, thirteen singles, including three as a featured performer and two with 116 Clique, ten music videos, including three as a featured performer and two with 116 Clique, a contributed track to a compilation album, and twenty-nine guest appearances.

Albums

Studio albums

With 116 Clique

Studio

EPs

Collaborative albums

Mixtapes

Singles

As lead artist

As featured performer

With 116 Clique

Other charted songs

Guest appearances

Music videos

As lead artist

As featured artist

With 116 Clique

References 

Discographies of American artists
Hip hop discographies